Chief Minister K.R. Gowthami is a 1994 Indian Malayalam film, directed by Babu Raj and produced by C. K. Ashokan. Titled in the name of KR Gowthami, the film was based on the life of K. R. Gouri Amma. This movie was made in 1994 after K.R Gouri was ousted from CPIM. The film stars Geetha, Vijayaraghavan, Devan and Sukumari in the lead roles. The film has musical score by Mohan Sithara.

Cast

Vijayaraghavan as Adv.Anathan
Devan as K.V Chakko
Geetha as Adv.K.R Gouwthamy
Prathapachandran as Kolakkattu Raghavan
C. I. Paul as Ramakrishnan
Ashokan as Santhosh
Jose Pellissery as Sreedharan Potty
Kollam Thulasi as Sachithandan
Kunchan as A.Kumaran Nambiyar
Mohan Jose as Abdu
Cherthala Lalitha as Pathumma
Tony as Thajudheen
Beena Antony as Sainaba
Chithra as Anitha
Sukumari
Kumarji Ponnadu
Sathaar
K. P. A. C. Azeez
Chaithanya
Jagannatha Varma
Njarakkal Sreeni

Soundtrack
The music was composed by Mohan Sithara.

References

External links
 
 

1994 films
1990s Malayalam-language films